Michael Green is an American talent manager, entrepreneur and movie producer.

Career
Green began his career as a personal appearance agent in the early 1990s at Irvin Arthur Associates representing stand up comedians.  He then moved to talent management at Gallin-Morey Associates, where he eventually became a Senior Manager.

In 1997, he co-founded The Firm, a music and talent management agency, with Jeff Kwatinetz. The company grew rapidly, eventually managing Backstreet Boys, Korn,  Limp Bizkit, Pamela Anderson and others. The Firm’s clients were responsible for more than $1.5 billion in business and the business was valued at more than $250 million. Expanding beyond the representation business, The Firm also acquired and sold the shoe brand Pony, and controlled an equity position in Build-A-Bear Workshops. In 2002, Green sold his interests in the company to spend time with his family.

In 2005, he founded a new management company, The Collective. The Collective continued to represent Green’s longtime clients like Martin Lawrence, and also signed Linkin Park, Counting Crows, Enrique Iglesias, Slash, Alanis Morissette, and Emile Hirsch, among others. As CEO, Green expanded The Collective outside simple talent management, acquiring the horror movie site Bloody-Disgusting.com and popular YouTube accounts and personalities like Fred and Annoying Orange under Collective Digital Studio.

Filmography

References

External links
The Collective homepage

American businesspeople
Living people
Literary agents
Talent agents
Year of birth missing (living people)